Nicole Joraanstad (born November 10, 1980 in Seattle, Washington) is an American curler from Verona, Wisconsin. She currently plays second for Erika Brown.

Career
At the 2000 World Junior Curling Championships, Joraanstad played third for Laura Delaney and won a bronze medal for Team USA. The following year, Joraanstad skipped her own team to a seventh-place finish.

Joraanstad would later join up with Patti Lank as her second, and Team USA finished in fourth place at the 2004 Ford World Curling Championships.

Joraanstad left Lank's team and joined up with Debbie McCormick. Team USA won a silver medal at the 2006 Ford World Women's Curling Championship losing to Sweden (skipped by Anette Norberg) in the final.

At the 2007 Aomori World Championships, Joraanstad and Debbie McCormick's Team USA lost to Scotland in the semi-final and took 4th place.

At the 2008 Women's National Championships in Hibbing, Minnesota, Joraanstad won her third straight national championship while playing for Debbie McCormick.  Team McCormick was the first team to ever win three consecutive U.S. national titles. At the 2008 Vernon World Championships, Joraanstad and Debbie McCormick's Team USA finished 6-5 after round-robin play and did not advance to the playoff round.

On June 4, 2008, Joraanstad received the Madison Sports Hall of Fame Club 2008 Sportswoman of the Year Award.

At the US National Championship / Olympic Trials - Curling in 2009, Joraanstad won her fourth straight national championship while playing with Debbie McCormick.  They also won the right to represent the US at the 2010 Olympic Winter Games in Vancouver, BC.

In 2010, McCormick left the team as skip, and was replaced by the team's third, Allison Pottinger. Joraanstad would be promoted to the team's third.

In 2011, Team Pottinger (who Nicole plays third for) lost the US National Championship final to Patti Lank.

In 2012, Team Pottinger beat Cassie Potter in the final to go on to the World Championships in Lethbridge, Alberta.  They lost a tie-breaker to get into the play-offs at the Worlds and finished fourth.  Their win at the US Nationals earned them a spot into the 2013 Olympic Trials - Curling for the 2014 Olympic Winter Games in Sochi, Russia.  The Olympic Trials - Curling are in November 2013.

Joraanstad has played in five Continental Cups, more than any North American curler.

Personal life
A native of Kent, Washington, Joraanstad attended Kentridge High School and holds a business degree from the University of Wisconsin-Madison.

Her father is curler Gary Joraanstad, 1987 United States Men's champion, he competed on 1987 Hexagon World Men's Curling Championship skipped by Jim Vukich.

Teams

References

External links
 
 Team USA profile

1980 births
Living people
Sportspeople from Seattle
Olympic curlers of the United States
Curlers at the 2010 Winter Olympics
Sportspeople from Madison, Wisconsin
American people of Dutch descent
American female curlers
American curling champions
Continental Cup of Curling participants
People from Verona, Wisconsin
21st-century American women